Soil microbiology is the study of microorganisms in soil, their functions, and how they affect soil properties. It is believed that between two and four billion years ago, the first ancient bacteria and microorganisms came about on Earth's oceans. These bacteria could fix nitrogen, in time multiplied, and as a result released oxygen into the atmosphere. This led to more advanced microorganisms, which are important because they affect soil structure and fertility. Soil microorganisms can be classified as bacteria, actinomycetes, fungi, algae and protozoa. Each of these groups has characteristics that define them and their functions in soil.

Up to 10 billion bacterial cells inhabit each gram of soil in and around plant roots, a region known as the rhizosphere. In 2011, a team detected more than 33,000 bacterial and archaeal species on sugar beet roots.

The composition of the rhizobiome can change rapidly in response to changes in the surrounding environment.

Bacteria 
Bacteria and Archaea, the smallest organisms in soil apart from viruses, are prokaryotic. They are the most abundant microorganisms in the soil, and serve many important purposes, including nitrogen fixation.

Some bacteria can colonize minerals in the soil and help influence weathering and the breaking down of these minerals. The overall composition of the soil can determine the amount of bacteria growing in the soil. The more minerals that are found in area can result in a higher abundance of bacteria. These bacteria will also form aggregates which increases the overall health of the soil.

Biochemical processes 
One of the most distinguished features of bacteria is their biochemical versatility. A bacterial genus called Pseudomonas can metabolize a wide range of chemicals and fertilizers. In contrast, another genus known as Nitrobacter can only derive its energy by turning nitrite into nitrate, which is also known as oxidation. The genus Clostridium is an example of bacterial versatility because it, unlike most species, can grow in the absence of oxygen, respiring anaerobically. Several species of Pseudomonas, such as Pseudomonas aeruginosa are able to respire both aerobically and anaerobically, using nitrate as the terminal electron acceptor.

 Nitrogen fixation 
Nitrogen is often the most limiting nutrient in soil and water.  Bacteria are responsible for the process of nitrogen fixation, which is the conversion of atmospheric nitrogen into nitrogen-containing compounds (such as ammonia) that can be used by plants. Autotrophic bacteria derive their energy by making their own food through oxidation, like the Nitrobacter species, rather than feeding on plants or other organisms. These bacteria are responsible for nitrogen fixation. The amount of autotrophic bacteria is small compared to heterotrophic bacteria (the opposite of autotrophic bacteria, heterotrophic bacteria acquire energy by consuming plants or other microorganisms), but are very important because almost every plant and organism requires nitrogen in some way.

 Actinomycetes 
Actinomycetes are soil microorganisms. They are a type of bacteria, but they share some characteristics with fungi that are most likely a result of convergent evolution due to a common habitat and lifestyle.

 Similarities to fungi 
Although they are members of the Bacteria kingdom, many actinomycetes share characteristics with fungi, including shape and branching properties, spore formation and secondary metabolite production.
 The mycelium branches in a manner similar to that of fungi
 They form aerial mycelium as well as conidia.
 Their growth in liquid culture occurs as distinct clumps or pellets, rather than as a uniform turbid suspension as in bacteria.

 Antibiotics 
One of the most notable characteristics of the actinomycetes is their ability to produce antibiotics. Streptomycin, neomycin, erythromycin and tetracycline are only a few examples of these antibiotics. Streptomycin is used to treat tuberculosis and infections caused by certain bacteria and neomycin is used to reduce the risk of bacterial infection during surgery. Erythromycin is used to treat certain infections caused by bacteria, such as bronchitis, pertussis (whooping cough), pneumonia and ear, intestine, lung, urinary tract and skin infections.

 Fungi 
Fungi are abundant in soil, but bacteria are more abundant. Fungi are important in the soil as food sources for other, larger organisms, pathogens, beneficial symbiotic relationships with plants or other organisms and soil health. Fungi can be split into species based primarily on the size, shape and color of their reproductive spores, which are used to reproduce. Most of the environmental factors that influence the growth and distribution of bacteria and actinomycetes also influence fungi. The quality as well as quantity of organic matter in the soil has a direct correlation to the growth of fungi, because most fungi consume organic matter for nutrition. Compared with bacteria, fungi are relatively benefitted by acidic soils. Fungi also grow well in dry, arid soils because fungi are aerobic, or dependent on oxygen, and the higher the moisture content in the soil, the less oxygen is present for them.

 Algae 
Algae can make their own nutrients through photosynthesis. Photosynthesis converts light energy to chemical energy that can be stored as nutrients. For algae to grow, they must be exposed to light because photosynthesis requires light, so algae are typically distributed evenly wherever sunlight and moderate moisture is available. Algae do not have to be directly exposed to the Sun, but can live below the soil surface given uniform temperature and moisture conditions. Algae are also capable of performing nitrogen fixation.

 Types 
Algae can be split up into three main groups: the Cyanophyceae, the Chlorophyceae and the bacillariophyceae. The Cyanophyceae contain chlorophyll, which is the molecule that absorbs sunlight and uses that energy to make carbohydrates from carbon dioxide and water and also pigments that make it blue-green to violet in color. The Chlorophyceae usually only have chlorophyll in them which makes them green, and the bacillariophyceae contain chlorophyll as well as pigments that make the algae brown in color.

 Blue-green algae and nitrogen fixation 
Blue-green algae, or Cyanophyceae, are responsible for nitrogen fixation. The amount of nitrogen they fix depends more on physiological and environmental factors rather than the organism’s abilities. These factors include intensity of sunlight, concentration of inorganic and organic nitrogen sources and ambient temperature and stability.

 Protozoa 
Protozoa are eukaryotic organisms that were some of the first microorganisms to reproduce sexually, a significant evolutionary step from duplication of spores, like those that many other soil microorganisms depend on. Protozoa can be split up into three categories: flagellates, amoebae and ciliates.

 Flagellates 
Flagellates are the smallest members of the protozoa group, and can be divided further based on whether they can participate in photosynthesis. Nonchlorophyll-containing flagellates are not capable of photosynthesis because chlorophyll is the green pigment that absorbs sunlight. These flagellates are found mostly in soil. Flagellates that contain chlorophyll typically occur in aquatic conditions. Flagellates can be distinguished by their flagella, which is their means of movement. Some have several flagella, while other species only have one that resembles a long branch or appendage.

 Amoebae 
Amoebae are larger than flagellates and move in a different way. Amoebae can be distinguished from other protozoa by their slug-like properties and pseudopodia. A pseudopodium or “false foot” is a temporary obtrusion from the body of the amoeba that helps pull it along surfaces for movement or helps to pull in food. The amoeba does not have permanent appendages and the pseudopodium is more of a slime-like consistency than a flagellum.

 Ciliates 
Ciliates are the largest of the protozoa group, and move by means of short, numerous cilia that produce beating movements. Cilia resemble small, short hairs. They can move in different directions to move the organism, giving it more mobility than flagellates or amoebae.

 Composition regulation 
Plant hormones, salicylic acid, jasmonic acid and ethylene are key regulators of innate immunity in plant leaves. Mutants impaired in salicylic acid synthesis and signaling are hypersusceptible to microbes that colonize the host plant to obtain nutrients, whereas mutants impaired in jasmonic acid and ethylene synthesis and signaling are hypersusceptible to herbivorous insects and microbes that kill host cells to extract nutrients. The challenge of modulating a community of diverse microbes in plant roots is more involved than that of clearing a few pathogens from inside a plant leaf. Consequently, regulating root microbiome composition may require immune mechanisms other than those that control foliar microbes.

A 2015 study analyzed a panel of Arabidopsis hormone mutants impaired in synthesis or signaling of individual or combinations of plant hormones, the microbial community in the soil adjacent to the root and in bacteria living within root tissue. Changes in salicylic acid signaling stimulated a reproducible shift in the relative abundance of bacterial phyla in the endophytic compartment. These changes were consistent across many families within the affected phyla, indicating that salicylic acid may be a key regulator of microbiome community structure.

Classical plant defense hormones also function in plant growth, metabolism and abiotic stress responses, obscuring the precise mechanism by which salicylic acid regulates this microbiome.

During plant domestication, humans selected for traits related to plant improvement, but not for plant associations with a beneficial microbiome. Even minor changes in abundance of certain bacteria can have a major effect on plant defenses and physiology, with only minimal effects on overall microbiome structure.

 Biochemical activity 

Most soil enzymes are produced by bacteria, fungi and plant roots. Their biochemical activity is a factor in both stabilization and degradation of soil structure. Enzyme activity is higher in plots that are fertilized with manure as compared to inorganic fertilizers. The microflora of the rhizosphere may increase activity of enzymes there.

 Applications 

 Agriculture 
Microbes can make nutrients and minerals in the soil available to plants, produce hormones that spur growth, stimulate the plant immune system and trigger or dampen stress responses. In general a more diverse soil microbiome results in fewer plant diseases and higher yield.

Farming can destroy soil's rhiziobiome (microbial ecosystem)  by using soil amendments such as fertilizer and pesticide without compensating for their effects. By contrast, healthy soil can increase fertility in multiple ways, including supplying nutrients such as nitrogen and protecting against pests and disease, while reducing the need for water and other inputs. Some approaches may even allow agriculture in soils that were never considered viable.

The group of bacteria called rhizobia live inside the roots of legumes and fix nitrogen from the air into a biologically useful form.

Mycorrhizae or root fungi form a dense network of thin filaments that reach far into the soil, acting as extensions of the plant roots they live on or in. These fungi facilitate the uptake of water and a wide range of nutrients.

Up to 30% of the carbon fixed by plants is excreted from the roots as so-called exudates—including sugars, amino acids, flavonoids, aliphatic acids, and fatty acids—that attract and feed beneficial microbial species while repelling and killing harmful ones.

 Commercial activity 

Almost all registered microbes are biopesticides, producing some $1 billion annually, less than 1% of the chemical amendment market, estimated at $110 billion. Some microbes have been marketed for decades, such as Trichoderma fungi that suppress other, pathogenic fungi, and the caterpillar killer Bacillus thuringiensis. Serenade is a biopesticide containing a Bacillus subtilis strain that has antifungal and antibacterial properties and promotes plant growth. It can be applied in a liquid form on plants and to soil to fight a range of pathogens. It has found acceptance in both conventional and organic agriculture.

Agrochemical companies such as Bayer have begun investing in the technology. In 2012, Bayer bought AgraQuest for $425 million. Its €10 million annual research budget funds field-tests of dozens of new fungi and bacteria to replace chemical pesticides or to serve as biostimulants to promote crop health and growth. Novozymes, a company developing microbial fertilizers and pesticides, forged an alliance with Monsanto.  Novozymes invested in a biofertilizer containing the soil fungus Penicillium bilaiae and a bioinsecticide that contains the fungus Metarhizium anisopliae. In 2014 Syngenta and BASF acquired companies developing microbial products, as did Dupont in 2015.

A 2007 study showed that a complex symbiosis with fungi and viruses makes it possible for a grass called Dichanthelium lanuginosum to thrive in geothermal soils in Yellowstone National Park, where temperatures reach . Introduced in the US market in 2014 for corn and rice, they trigger an adaptive stress response.

In both the US and Europe, companies have to provide regulatory authorities with evidence that both the individual strains and the product as a whole are safe, leading many existing products to label themselves "biostimulants" instead of  “biopesticides”.

When selecting a bacterium for disease control its other effects must also be considered. Stevens et al 1998 find bacterial denitrification and dissimilatory nitrate reduction to ammonium to especially occur at high pH.

 Unhelpful microbes 

A funguslike unicellular organism named Phytophthora infestans, responsible for potato blight and other crop diseases, has caused famines throughout history. Other fungi and bacteria cause the decay of roots and leaves.

Many strains that seemed promising in the lab often failed to prove effective in the field, because of soil, climate and ecosystem effects, leading companies to skip the lab phase and emphasize field tests.

 Fade 

Populations of beneficial microbes can diminish over time. Serenade stimulates a high initial B. subtilis'' density, but levels decrease because the bacteria lacks a defensible niche. One way to compensate is to use multiple collaborating strains.

Fertilizers deplete soil of organic matter and trace elements, cause salination and suppress mycorrhizae; they can also turn symbiotic bacteria into competitors.

Pilot project 

A pilot project in Europe used a plow to slightly loosen and ridge the soil. They planted oats and vetch, which attracts nitrogen-fixing bacteria. They planted small olive trees to boost microbial diversity. They split an unirrigated 100-hectare field into three zones, one treated with chemical fertilizer and pesticides; and the other two with different amounts of an organic biofertilizer, consisting of fermented grape leftovers and a variety of bacteria and fungi, along with four types of mycorrhiza spores.

The crops that had received the most organic fertilizer had reached nearly twice the height of those in zone A and were inches taller than zone C. The yield of that section equaled that of irrigated crops, whereas the yield of the conventional technique was negligible. The mycorrhiza had penetrated the rock by excreting acids, allowing plant roots to reach almost 2 meters into the rocky soil and reach groundwater.

Soil microbiologists 
 Nikolai Aleksandrovich Krasil'nikov (1896-1973), Russian
 Michael Goodfellow (1941-Present), British

See also 
 Natural farming
 Korean natural farming
 Effective microorganisms
 Soil biology
 Soil biomantle
 Soil life

References 

Microbiology
Soil biology